The 1987 Cork Intermediate Hurling Championship was the 78th staging of the Cork Intermediate Hurling Championship since its establishment by the Cork County Board in 1909. The draw for the opening round fixtures took place on 21 December 1986. The championship ran from 6 June to 8 November 1987.

On 8 November 1987, Erin's Own won the championship following a 1-06 to 0-08 defeat of Mallow in the final at Bride Rovers Park. This was their second championship title overall and their first title since 1984.

Ballymartle's Martin Fitzpatrick was the championship's top scorer with 1-22.

Results

First round

Second round

Quarter-finals

Semi-finals

Final

Championship statistics

Top scorers

Overall

In a single game

References

Cork Intermediate Hurling Championship
Cork Intermediate Hurling Championship